The 1950 Chilean Grand Prix was a Formula Libre motor race held at Santiago on December 17, 1950. The race was won by Juan Manuel Fangio in a Ferrari 166FL.

Race

References

El Gran Premio de Chile de 1950 y el Ferrari 166FL

Motorsport competitions in Chile
Chilean Grand Prix
1950 in Chilean sport
Chilean Grand Prix